Garam Masala is a 2005 Indian Hindi-language comedy film written and directed by Priyadarshan, featuring Akshay Kumar, John Abraham, Paresh Rawal, Rimi Sen, Neha Dhupia and Rajpal Yadav. The story revolves around Makarand "Mac" Deendayal Chatpatiya (Kumar) and Shyam "Sam" Salgaonkar (Abraham), two photographer friends, who like to flirt with women constantly. After a trip abroad, Shyam decides to disrupt Makarand's life when he sees him enjoying the company of three ladies. The film is a remake of Priyadarshan's own 1985 Malayalam comedy Boeing Boeing, in turn a remake of the 1965 film of the same name, which in turn was based on the 1960 French play of the same name.  A famous hotel comedy sequence from this movie was borrowed from Priyadarshan's another 1985 Malayalam movie Aram + Aram = Kinnaram.

The film was released during Diwali in 2005 and received mixed reviews from the critics. However, Kumar was appreciated for his performance which also won him Best Actor in a Comic Role award at the Filmfare Awards.

Plot
The film starts off when two photographers Makarand "Mac" Deendayal Chatpatiya and Shyam "Sam" Salgaonkar are doing a photo shoot. While Mac is shooting the models in exposing poses, his fiancée Anjali  leaves in disgust due to Mac's closeness to the models. Their boss calls them into his office and tells them that they are good-for-nothing photographers. He threatens to reduce their pay if they don't get some good pictures for the world photography competition to make his magazine Garam Masala famous.

Both Mac and Sam ask Maggie, the boss's secretary, on a date on the same day, at the same restaurant at the same time. As all three meet up at the restaurant a pickpocket takes Mac's and Sam's wallets. After the meal, the competition to impress Maggie heightens thus evoking humorous events after which Sam and Mac leave Maggie to pay the bill.

Sam visits a famous photographer, praising him and asking for a few outstanding shots. These stolen shots help Sam to win the world photography competition. He gets promoted, is given ten percent of the prize money and has his pay doubled, whilst Mac receives a demotion to assistant. Sam flies off to the US to enjoy his holiday, leaving Mac fuming in Mauritius.

The chief editor persuades Mac to show up Sam by getting three women to be his fiancées, getting a very expensive flat and driving very expensive, imported cars. Following his promise, Mac gets a high-quality flat and gets access to three beautiful air hostesses. His driver, Babban, is his key to the high life. Not only does Babban get Mac access to the flat, he delivers very high-end cars to impress his fiancées. He drives Mac's cars and does all his services for a small amount of liquor every day. Lastly, Babban gets Mac a housekeeper, Mambo, who has an attitude problem and doesn't care what goes on in his flat so long as his demands are met.

He has affairs with each of the three women — Deepti, Puja  and Sweety — and creates chaos. Sam returns from America, only to find his friend turned rival, playing around with three women at once. He tries to help his friend and tries out his own luck with the girls.

The story turns into mayhem when it's hard for the two boys to maintain the three girls simultaneously. Mac's original fiancée Anjali learns about Mac's acts, and it creates a bigger mess. When their cook Mambo leaves, they begin to realise their mistakes and Mac attempts reuniting with Anjali; in the end Mac tries to climb on the car which Anjali and Sam are in while being chased by the three women he was dating now that they realised the truth.

Cast
 Akshay Kumar as Makrand "Mac" Deendayal Chatpatiya 
 John Abraham as Shyam "Sam" Salgaonkar
 Paresh Rawal as Mambo
 Rimi Sen as Anjali Bhatnagar, Mac's real fiancée and to-be wife 
 Neha Dhupia as Maggie          
 Daisy Bopanna as Deepti Sinha, an airhostess, Mac's fiancée
 Neetu Chandra as Sweety Nair, an airhostess, Mac's fiancée
 Nargis Bagheri as Puja Dhawan, an airhostess, Mac's fiancée
 Rajpal Yadav as Babban
 Manoj Joshi as Nageshwar
 Asrani as Mamu, Mac's maternal uncle
 Viju Khote as Mac & Sam's Boss
 Prithvi Zutshi as Landlord Padgaonkar

Soundtrack

The music is composed by Pritam while the lyrics are penned by Sameer and Mayur Puri. All the remix songs are mixed by DJ Suketu.Background Score by D. Imman.

Track listing

Release 
The film was theatrically released on the occasion of Diwali, 2 November 2005.

Reception

Box office
Made on a budget of 170 million, the film grossed 546.5 million in its theatrical run.

Critical response
Raja Sen of Rediff.com called the film ″funniest film of the year″, writing ″Akshay Kumar rocks the film. In a commandingly restrained performance, the actor shows off topnotch comic timing to hilarious effect. Balancing subtle shifts of tone with wildly over-the-top slapstick, he manages to always get a laugh, even when the script falters. There's a self-deprecating aspect visible in Akshay's comedy that adds warmth to the film. And he counters his goofy grin with a terrific display of deadpan dialogue delivery. This is his film, and he's having a ball.″

Conversely, Namrata Joshi of Outlook Magazine gave the film 2 stars out of 5, writing ″Priyadarshan again shows a spirit for mirth and mania but the film is not quite a laugh riot.″ Kaveree Bamzai of India Today wrote ″The lines are suited to the revolving-door kind of sex comedy. So there are many jibes about thighs, eyes and undies, which are ridiculous enough to elicit laughter from the devotees of films like No Entry.″

Accolades
Won
  Filmfare Awards for Best Comedian – Akshay Kumar

References

External links
 
 
 

2005 films
2000s Hindi-language films
2000s buddy comedy films
Indian buddy comedy films
Hindi remakes of English films
Hindi remakes of Malayalam films
Films directed by Priyadarshan
Films featuring songs by Pritam
Films involved in plagiarism controversies
2005 comedy films